Serhiy Serhiyovych Shvets (born 10 May 1992) is a Ukrainian professional footballer who plays as a centre-back for LNZ Cherkasy.

Career
In summer 2022 he moved to LNZ Cherkasy.

In January 2023 he moved to Prykarpattia Ivano-Frankivsk.

References

External links
 
 

1992 births
Living people
Piddubny Olympic College alumni
Ukrainian footballers
Association football defenders
FC Zhemchuzhyna Odesa players
FC Real Pharma Odesa players
FC Sudnobudivnyk Mykolaiv (2016) players
FC Podillya Khmelnytskyi players
FC Polissya Zhytomyr players
FC Kramatorsk players
FC LNZ Cherkasy players
Ukrainian First League players
Ukrainian Second League players
Sportspeople from Odesa Oblast